The Senior men's race at the 2009 IAAF World Cross Country Championships was held at the Al Bisharat Golf Course in Amman, Jordan, on March 28, 2009.  Reports of the event were given in The New York Times and for the IAAF.

Complete results for individuals, and for teams were published.

Race results

Senior men's race (12 km)

Individual

Teams

Note: Athletes in parentheses did not score for the team result.

Participation
According to an unofficial count, 145 athletes from 44 countries participated in the Senior men's race.  This is in agreement with the official numbers as published.  The announced athletes from  did not show.

 (1)
 (2)
 (1)
 (3)
 (1)
 (1)
 (4)
 (5)
 (4)
 (2)
 (1)
 (5)
 (6)
 (6)
 (6)
 (1)
 (1)
 (4)
 (1)
 (1)
 (5)
 (6)
 (6)
 (1)
 (1)
 (6)
 (1)
 (1)
 (6)
 (6)
 (5)
 (2)
 (1)
 (6)
 (6)
 (2)
 (1)
 (3)
 (2)
 (6)
 (6)
 (6)
 (1)
 (3)

See also
 2009 IAAF World Cross Country Championships – Junior men's race
 2009 IAAF World Cross Country Championships – Senior women's race
 2009 IAAF World Cross Country Championships – Junior women's race

References

Senior men's race at the World Athletics Cross Country Championships
IAAF World Cross Country Championships